Ajoy Ghose was an Indian mining engineer. Ghose was a Fellow of the Indian National Academy of Engineering. He died on 13 March 2019.

Books
 Small Scale Mining: A Global Overview. India Book House Limited

 Engineered Rock Structures in Mining and Civil Construction. Taylor and Francis, London, 2006. (with R.N. Singh)
 Environment-friendly techniques of rock breaking. A. A. Balkema, Lisse, 2003. (with Janusz Reś and Krzysztof Wladzielczyk)

Edited volumes
 Ghose, A.K., (Editor), Rock Mechanics- Theory and Practice, The Institution of Engineers(India), Calcutta, 1974
 Ghose, A.K., (Editor), Optimal Exploitation of Solid Mineral Resources: Challenges and Constraints, Proc. 12th World Mining Congress, The Institution of Engineers (India), Calcutta, 1984 Ghose, A.K., (Editor)., Strategies for Exploitation of Mineral Resources in Developing Countries, Oxford & IBH, New Delhi, 1987.
 Ghose, A.K., Simic, R., and Najberg, M. (Editors), 30 Years of World Mining Congress, SITRGMJ, Beograd, 1988.
 Ghose, A.K., and Ramani, R.V., (Editors), Longwall Thick Seam Mining, Oxford & IBH, New Delhi, 1988.
 Ghose, A.K., and Seshagiri Rao, H.S., (Editors), Rockbursts and Bumps- Global Experiences, Oxford & IBH, New Delhi, 1990.
 Ghose, A.K. (Technical Editor), English edition of "Coal Cutting by Winning Machines" (in Russian) by E.Z. Pozin, V.Z. Melamed, and V.V. Ton, Oxford & IBH, New Delhi, 1989.
 Ghose, A.K. (Editor), Small-Scale Mining - A Global Overview, Oxford & IBH, New Delhi, 1993.
 Ghose, A.K. (Technical Editor), English Translation of "Seismic Effects of Blasting in Rock" from Russian by A.A. Kuzmenko, V.D. Vorobev, I.I. Denisyek, and A.A. Dauetas, Oxford & IBH, New Delhi, 1993.
 Ghose, A.K. (Editor), English Translation of "Rock Breakage by Blasting" from Russian by M.I. Petrosyan, Oxford & IBH, New Delhi, 1994.
 Ghose, A.K. (Technical Editor), English Translation of "Mining and Industrial Applications of Low Density Explosives" from Russian by Baranov, Vedin and Bondarnko, Oxford & IBH, New Delhi, 1996
 Ghose, A.K. (Editor), Small/Medium Scale Mining, Oxford & IBH, New Delhi, 1997 (Republished as "Mining on Small and Medium Scale- A Global Perspective" by Intermediate Technology Publications, London, 1997).
 Ghose, A.K., and Bose, L.K (Editors)., Mining in the 21st Century, Proc. of 19th World Mining Congress, New Delhi, Oxford & IBH, New Delhi, 2003.
 Ghose, A.K., and Dhar, B.B. (Editors), Mining Challenges of the 21st Century, APH Publishers, New Delhi, 2000.

References

External links
Keynote at 2008 World Mining Congress

Indian mining engineers
2019 deaths